Hyptiotes puebla is a species of cribellate orb weaver in the family of spiders known as Uloboridae. It is found in the United States and Mexico.

References

Uloboridae
Articles created by Qbugbot
Spiders described in 1964